Neothyone is a genus of moths in the subfamily Arctiinae.

Species
 Neothyone schistaceoplagiata Rothschild, 1913
 Neothyone xanthaema Dognin, 1912

References

Natural History Museum Lepidoptera generic names catalog

Lithosiini